Plano is an unincorporated community on former U.S. Route 66, now Route 266 in Greene County, Missouri, United States. The community is part of the Springfield, Missouri Metropolitan Statistical Area.

A post office called Plano was established in 1895, and remained in operation until 1903. The name most likely is a transfer from Plano, Texas. Little remains of the original community.

References

Unincorporated communities in Greene County, Missouri
Ghost towns on U.S. Route 66
Springfield metropolitan area, Missouri
Unincorporated communities in Missouri